A hedgehog is a small, spiny mammal.

Hedgehog may also refer to:
Domesticated hedgehog
Hedgehog (band), a Beijing rock band
Hedgehog cactus (disambiguation), a common name for Pediocactus, Echinocereus, or Echinopsis
Hedgehog plant, Erinacea anthyllis
Hedgehog (chess), a pawn formation in chess
Hedgehog (weapon), an anti-submarine weapon
Czech hedgehog (military), an anti-tank, anti-vehicle obstacle
Hedgehog signaling pathway, a signal transduction pathway
The Hedgehog, a 2009 French film directed by Mona Achache
Hedgehog (EP), an EP by Melt-Banana
Hedgehog (film)
Hedgehog (geometry), a curve formed as the envelope of lines determined by a support function
Hedgehog (hypergraph), a hypergraph formed from a complete graph by adding another vertex to each edge.

See also
Hedgehog space, a topological space
Hedgehog mushroom (disambiguation), multiple uses
Hedgehog defence, a military stratagem
Sonic the Hedgehog (series), a video game series
Ron Jeremy, nickname "The Hedgehog", actor
Hedgehog's dilemma, a philosophical analogy
Hedgehog slice, a chocolate cake with biscuit pieces
The Hedgehog and the Fox, an essay by the philosopher Isaiah Berlin
Sonic hedgehog, a protein playing a key role in vertebrate organogenesis